Pilkhuwa is a town and a municipal board in Hapur district in the Indian state of Uttar Pradesh. It is located 12 km from Hapur, the district headquarters. It is famous for its textile products and handloom industry.

It is located on National Highway-9, which connects the National Capital Territory of Delhi to Lucknow, the capital city of Uttar Pradesh.

History

In the 12th century, Delhi was ruled by the Rajput King Raja Anangpal Singh Tomar. The etymology of Pilkhuwa lies in the story of an elephant named "Pil", that disappeared from Delhi state, after which the king sent his son to find it. When the search team made a stop at the village of Pilkhuwa, people gathered around them and began saying "Pil-Khuwa", meaning "Pil is lost".

In 1235, Pilkhuwa was established by the Tomar Kings under the Tomar Dynasty. However, in the 14th century, when the Tomar Kings were defeated by the Delhi Sultanate, the Rajput population of Pilkhuwa was affected and their rule came to an end. Pilkhuwa was part of Meerut district until 1976, when on the anniversary of Jawaharlal Nehru's birth, the then-chief minister N. D. Tiwari declared Ghaziabad as a new district. Later on, Ghaziabad was divided into two districts: Ghaziabad and Panchsheel Nagar by Bahujan Samaj Party chief minister Mayawati on 28 September 2011, and Pilkhuwa became part of Panchsheel Nagar. At the time, Panchsheel Nagar was the newly-given name to the city of Hapur by Mayawati; local people were unhappy about the name change, however. Due to political clashes between the Samajwadi Party and Bahujan Samaj Party, the subsequent chief minister Akhilesh Yadav changed the district name to Hapur on 23 July 2012, retaining the original name. Finally, Pilkhuwa became part of Hapur district.

Demographics
As of the 2011 Indian Census, Pilkhuwa had a total population of 83,736, of which 44,226 were males and 39,510 were females. The population within the 0-6 age group was 12,468. The total number of literates in Pilkhuwa was 55,936, which constituted 66.8% of the population. Male literacy was 73.3% and female literacy was 59.5%. The effective literacy rate of the 7+ population of Pilkhuwa was 78.5%, of which male literacy rate was 86.5% and female literacy rate was 69.6%. The Scheduled Castes population was 14,370. Pilkhuwa had 13,746 households in 2011.

Economy
Pilkhuwa is notable for its handloom cotton textiles and exotic printing on khadi and handloom fabrics. There were 120 medium scale industries, 1400 power looms and 3 niwar factories in Pilkhuwa in 1991. 7000 persons employed in textile production, 2000 in cloth sheet washing, 500 in pressing machines, 500 in dyeing, 100 in kundis and 200 in stamping and design. Most of the handloom cloths manufactured in Pilkhuwa is supplied to Meerut apart from centres in other parts of India and abroad.

Educational institutes & Companies
Raj Kumar Goel Engineering College
Saraswati Medical College
DRDO Skills development training centre
Larson & Tourbo

Notable people

 Kumar Vishwas
 Manish Sisodia

References

Cities and towns in Hapur district